Luckinbill is a surname. Notable people with the surname include:

Laurence Luckinbill (born 1934), American actor, playwright, and director
Thad Luckinbill (born 1975), American actor and producer 

English-language surnames